Yekaterina Aleksandrovna Lobova (born October 25, 1998) is a Russian ice hockey player. She most recently played with Biryusa Krasnoyarsk of the Zhenskaya Hockey League (ZhHL) in the 2020–21 season.

Lobova represented  at the 2017 IIHF Women's World Championship and 2017 Winter Universiade, and participated in the women’s ice hockey tournament at the 2018 Winter Olympics with the Olympic Athletes from Russia team.

References

External links
 
 

1998 births
Living people
Russian women's ice hockey defencemen
Sportspeople from Novosibirsk
Biryusa Krasnoyarsk players
Ice hockey players at the 2018 Winter Olympics
Olympic ice hockey players of Russia
Universiade gold medalists for Russia
Universiade medalists in ice hockey
Competitors at the 2017 Winter Universiade